Elizabeth Algrávez (born 1972) is a Mexican poet, translator, and editor who was born in Mexicali.

She has a degree in Hispanic-American language and literature as well as a master's degree in marketing.

Algrávez has published five books.

Selected works
Cantos buranos (1993)
Arenario (1994)
La Mujer habitada (1994)
Trilogía de arena (1999)
Venenos (2011)

References

1972 births
Living people
20th-century Mexican poets
21st-century Mexican poets
Mexican women poets
Mexican translators
Academic staff of the Autonomous University of Baja California
People from Mexicali